The fourth USS Preble (DD-345/DM-20/AG-99) was a Clemson-class destroyer in the United States Navy following World War I, and saw combat in World War II as a minelayer. She was named for Commodore Edward Preble.

History
Preble was laid down by the Bath Iron Works, Bath, Maine, 12 April 1919; launched 8 March 1920; sponsored by Miss Sallie MacIntosh Tucker; and commissioned at the Boston Navy Yard 19 March 1920.

After shakedown in Cuban waters, Preble was assigned special duty in Mexican waters, arriving Vera Cruz 13 June. During the following weeks she made three voyages to Galveston, Texas, to obtain medical supplies including serum to fight bubonic plague which had developed during the rebellion of the Sonora triumvirate. In August she returned north to join the Atlantic Fleet in East Coast and Caribbean exercises. In January 1921 the Atlantic and Pacific Fleets joined off the Panama Canal Zone and cruised to the west coast of South America. Separating on 23 February, the Atlantic Fleet steamed back to the Caribbean.

Preble departed Newport, Rhode Island, 20 June en route to the Asiatic Station, via Suez, with units of Squadron 15. She arrived at Chefoo, China, 26 August 1922, and for the next 7 years cruised off the coast of Asia from Manchuria to Burma, in Japanese waters, and amongst the Philippines, East Indies, and Marianas Islands. In September 1923 she assisted victims of violent earthquakes which shook Japan. From 12 June to 2 July 1924 she was at Rangoon, Burma, and Calcutta, India, delivering gas and oil for a round-the-world flight of Army planes. In 1927 Preble was assigned patrol duty in strife-torn China, taking aboard American and foreign refugees and escorting merchant vessels in the Yangtze and Huangpu Rivers. On several occasions Chinese factions fired on Preble from shore, but there were no casualties.

Preble departed Tsingtao, China, 12 July 1929 and returned to San Diego, California, 17 August 1929. For several years she was based at San Diego, cruising along the western seaboard of the United States, with operations in waters of Mexico and the Caribbean. During her stay at San Diego, Preble was used for on-board location shooting of a 1931 RKO-Pathé Pictures film about World War I destroyers, Suicide Fleet, one of the three primary ships used for the filming of the movie. She was assigned to Rotating Reserve Destroyer Squadron 20 at the Mare Island Navy Yard 24 September 1932. In May 1934 Preble engaged in Fleet Problem 15 off the Panama Canal and in Cuban waters, before returning to the Pacific. She participated in Fleet Problems 16 and 18 in the Hawaiian area in May–June 1935 and April–May 1937.

On 19 May 1937 Preble was transferred from Destroyers, Battle Force, to duty with Minecraft, Battle Force. Converted to a light minelayer, she was reclassified DM-20, effective 30 June 1937. She departed Pearl Harbor 20 September 1937 for mine training operations on the West Coast and returned to Hawaii in December. She remained in the Hawaiian area until the outbreak of World War II, engaging in scheduled mining exercises and fleet maneuvers.

World War II
On 7 December 1941 when the Japanese forces launched their attack, Preble was being overhauled at Pearl Harbor and was unable to get underway. As necessary guns and ammunition were not aboard, a large number of Preble's crew handled ammunition, fought fires, and cared for the wounded aboard Pennsylvania (BB-38). On 30 January 1942 Preble completed her yard overhaul and joined the patrol operating just off the Pearl Harbor entrance. On 1 April she departed Pearl Harbor with units of Mine Division 1 to lay a large minefield at French Frigate Shoals, 500 miles northwest of Oahu. In July she assisted in laying a defensive minefield around the base at Kodiak, Alaska, returning to Pearl Harbor via Seattle, Washington, for overhaul and patrol operations. On 6 December she departed Pearl Harbor for the Fiji Islands and Noumea, New Caledonia, serving on escort duty in the New Hebrides during January 1943.

On the night of 31 January Tracy (DM-19), Montgomery (DM-17), and Preble laid mines in the mouth of the Tenambo River, Guadalcanal, to prevent the evacuation of enemy troops. During the next two months Preble performed escort duties to the New Hebrides and Russell Islands.

On the night of 6 May Preble with minelayers Gamble (DM-15) and Breese (DM-18) in company with Radford (DD-446) laid mines in Ferguson Passage between Gizo and Wanawana Islands in the Solomons. On the night of 7–8 May these mines sank a Japanese destroyer and damaged two others which were sunk the next day by torpedo bombers from Guadalcanal.

On 24 May Preble rescued 85 survivors from torpedoed SS Stanvac Manila. On the night of 28 June Breese, Gamble, and Preble mined the waters near Shortland Island to prevent units of the Japanese fleet based there from interfering with landing operations on Rendova Island in the New Georgia Group, which were to be carried out at dawn. During July and August Preble again served as an escort vessel. On 9 September she departed Nouméa for San Francisco.

 
After overhaul and convoy escort duty to Pearl Harbor, Preble reached Majuro, Marshall Islands, 3 February 1944 where she served as antisubmarine screen and mine layer before returning to Pearl Harbor. She then made three escort voyages from Pearl Harbor to Marshall Islands ports. After minesweeping training, Preble departed Purvis Bay, Florida Island, 6 September, with minesweeping units of Rear Admiral Jesse B. Oldendorf's TG 32.5. Arriving off Peleliu in the early morning of 12 September, while fire support ships opened bombardment, Preble separated to investigate the shoals between Anguar and Peleliu Islands where the enemy had been suspected of planting acoustic mines. The next day she helped rescue survivors of Perry (DMS-17) which had struck a mine. She continued to perform various screening and minesweeping duties.

Preble arrived at Manus, Admiralty Islands on 1 October, where she joined mine sweeping Task Group 77.5 which arrived off the entrance to Leyte Gulf 17 October where she remained laying buoys and acting as mine destruction vessel for 6 days before returning to Manus. After training at Manus, she returned to San Pedro Bay 1 January 1945, but steamed a month later for Pearl Harbor and much needed repairs in the States, arriving San Francisco 8 March.

Returning to Pearl Harbor 8 May, Preble was redesignated a miscellaneous auxiliary vessel (AG-99) 5 June. She was assigned to duty escorting aircraft carriers engaged in training, acting as anti-submarine patrol vessel and plane guard during flight operations. She reached Guam with Vella Gulf (CVE-111) 20 July, subsequently escorting Vella Gulf to Okinawa. After returning to Guam, she escorted Sitkoh Bay (CVE-86) to Samar, Philippines, arriving 20 September.

Fate
Preble steamed for the United States 9 October, arriving Norfolk 20 November. She decommissioned at the Norfolk Naval Shipyard 7 December 1945. Her name was struck from the Navy List 3 January 1946 and she was sold for scrap to Luria Brothers of Philadelphia 26 October 1946.

Honors and awards
Preble earned 8 battle stars for World War II service.

Postscript
In the episode "Long Live the King" from the first season (1964–1965) of the television show Voyage to the Bottom of the Sea, the long-since-scrapped USS Preble (DD-345) is plainly visible in stock footage used in the final quarter of the episode, and the Captain Lee Crane character played by David Hedison indicates that the footage is showing the advanced units of the United States Seventh Fleet during the 1970s, the time period in which the first season is set.
In the 1931 film "Suicide Fleet" the Preble is seen as one of several ships assisting in rescuing survivors of sinking ship. The scene is in the first of hour of the movie. The film stars William Boyd, Robert Armstrong, James Gleason, and Ginger Rogers. Later shipboard scenes are also shot aboard the Preble; giving a good look at the ship as she looked in 1931. There is one particularly interesting scene where a close in shot of the Preble making a close-in pass (with-in 50 ft.) of a sailing ship.

Even though not named but clearly marked 345, the USS Preble appeared in the 1942 movie, The Navy Came Through starring Desi Arnez and Jackie Cooper. The Clemson class destroyer is easily identified by its tell-tale four smoke stacks, also known as a 'Four Stacker'.

See USS Preble for other ships of this name.

References

The U.S.S. Preble was featured in the movies Charlie Chan at the Olympics.

External links
http://www.navsource.org/archives/05/345.htm

Clemson-class destroyers
World War II mine warfare vessels of the United States
World War II auxiliary ships of the United States
Ships built in Bath, Maine
1920 ships
Ships present during the attack on Pearl Harbor